Lankford House, also known as Anderson House, is a historic home located at Marion, Somerset County, Maryland. It is a two-story, four-bay, single-pile frame house constructed between 1834 and 1840. It features well executed, Greek Revival trim and woodwork.  A single story frame hyphen connects the main house to a frame kitchen built about 1798.  Also on the property is the 19th century Lankford family burial plot and frame smokehouse.

It was listed on the National Register of Historic Places in 1984.

References

External links
, including photo from 1984, at Maryland Historical Trust

Houses in Somerset County, Maryland
Houses on the National Register of Historic Places in Maryland
Houses completed in 1840
Greek Revival houses in Maryland
National Register of Historic Places in Somerset County, Maryland